Chigwell was a local government district in south west Essex, England. It contained the settlements of Chigwell, Loughton and Buckhurst Hill; and formed part of the Metropolitan Police District.

Formation
It was created an urban district by a county review order on 1 October 1933 as the merger of the former area of:

Buckhurst Hill Urban District (874 acres)
Loughton Urban District (3,962 acres)
Chigwell civil parish only, from Epping Rural District (4,135 acres)

Development
The district lay on the edge of the Greater London Conurbation and experienced a rapid population growth, in part caused  by London County Council out-county construction at Loughton, the Urban District's headquarters, and also in the south east of the district of the Hainault Estate (which also extended into  neighbouring Ilford and Dagenham). Extensive council house building by the Chigwell Urban District itself took place between Buckhurst Hill and Loughton. 

In 1948, the New Works Programme of the London Passenger Transport Board brought the London Underground services of the Central line to six stations in the district; namely Roding Valley, Chigwell, Grange Hill, Buckhurst Hill, Loughton and Debden. The large LT Hainault depot was also mostly in the U.D.

Coat of arms
The coat of arms were granted in 1951 and represent Or, a stag at rest proper, on a chief gules three axe-heads bendwise sinister with blades down-words argent.

Abolition
The Royal Commission on Local Government in Greater London considered the entire district for inclusion in Greater London, however after strong local resistance, only a small area of  around Hainault was transferred from the urban district and Essex to form part of the London Borough of Redbridge in Greater London in 1965. The population of this area in 1961 was 7,071.

On 1 April 1974 the remainder of the district was abolished by the Local Government Act 1972 and the area has since formed part of the Epping Forest district.

References

Political history of Essex
Epping Forest District
Districts of England abolished by the Local Government Act 1972
Urban districts of England
Chigwell